The Denmark national cricket team represents Denmark in international cricket. They have been an associate member of the International Cricket Council (ICC) since 1966, and have previously been a part of the ICC's High Performance Programme.

Denmark played in the inaugural edition of the ICC Cricket World Cup Challenge League starting in August 2019 as a result of finishing in Division Three of the now defunct World Cricket League.

History

Beginnings

Cricket has been played in Denmark since the mid-19th century, with the first club being formed in 1865 by English railway engineers. The first organised match was played the following year between two teams of English players, with the first matches involving Danish players taking place in 1866. The game expanded greatly over the following twenty years, with 30 new clubs being formed in 1883.

Several touring sides from England and Scotland visited the country in the early part of the 20th century, including the famous Marylebone Cricket Club. In 1933, an attempt to organise the first international match against the Netherlands failed, and it wasn't until 1954 when the Danish national side played their first match against Oxford University, the year after the current Danish Cricket Federation was formed.

They then began to play against other national sides, primarily the Netherlands, who they first played in 1955. They played their first match against Scotland in 1961.

ICC membership

Denmark became an associate member of the ICC in 1966, drawing their international against Scotland that year. They played Bermuda for the first time in 1969 and drew their first match against Ireland in 1970. They finally picked up their first international win against the Netherlands in 1972.

They played their first matches against Canada in 1974, losing a three-day match but winning the limited overs match. They played home internationals against East Africa and Sri Lanka, beating East Africa. They toured East Africa the following year, drawing with both East Africa and Kenya.

They took part in the first ICC Trophy in 1979, reaching the semi final where they lost to Sri Lanka. They did not take part in the 1982 tournament. In 1983, Ole Mortensen became the first Danish player to play county cricket. Denmark returned to the ICC Trophy in 1986 and finished third after beating Bermuda in the third place play-off.

In 1989, Denmark hosted Australia for two one-day matches. They lost the first match in Brøndby by 45 runs and lost the second in Copenhagen by 54 runs. They fared better at home against Canada that year, winning twice against them. After playing both home and away against Bangladesh in 1990, they played in the ICC Trophy, reaching the second round.

Denmark again played in the ICC Trophy in 1994, finishing tenth in the tournament after losing to Namibia in the plate final. They played their first matches against France in 1995, and hosted the first European Cricket Championship in 1996, finishing third. They finished fifth in the following years ICC Trophy and were runners up in the European Championship in 1998.

In 1999, Denmark took part in the NatWest Trophy for the first time. The following year, they took part in the ICC Emerging Nations Tournament in Zimbabwe, where they finished fourth, and the European Championship, where they finished last, without winning a game. The following year, they took part in the ICC Trophy in Canada, finishing eighth. The MCC toured Denmark in 2002, and Denmark won all three matches. They won just one match at that year's European Championship, finishing fifth ahead of Italy.

2000-2017

The Netherlands visited Denmark in 2003, winning both matches. Denmark played a two match series against Ireland later in the year, losing both matches and missing out on qualification for the ICC Intercontinental Cup. They again finished last in the European Championship the following year. In 2005, they played their final match in the Cheltenham & Gloucester Trophy, losing heavily to Northamptonshire at Svanholm Park before taking part in the 2005 ICC Trophy, where they again finished eighth.

In 2006, Denmark again took part in the European Championship, finishing fourth after winning only against Italy. At the end of that year, it was announced that they would join the ICC's High Performance Programme from 1 April 2007.

In August 2007, Denmark registered a win over Bermuda, an ODI playing country, and towards the end of October 2007 they played in Kenya against domestic teams and Kenya A. Denmark, led by Freddie Klokker who scored consecutive centuries in all their matches, clean swept the Kenyan sides and Kenya A. Denmark bowled, batted and fielded exceptionally well.

In November 2007, Denmark took part in Division Two of the World Cricket League. In finishing fourth, they qualified to compete in the 2009 ICC World Cup Qualifier. However, they eventually came last of the twelve teams, meaning they were relegated to Division Three of the World Cricket League. They next competed in the 2011 ICC World Cricket League Division Three, where they came 5th to be relegated to the Division Four.

In November 2013, they competed in the 2013 ICC World Twenty20 Qualifier in the UAE where they finished in last place, failing to win a game.

2018-Present
In April 2018, the ICC decided to grant full Twenty20 International (T20I) status to all its members. Therefore, all Twenty20 matches played between Denmark and other ICC members after 1 January 2019 will be a full T20I.

In September 2018, Denmark qualified from Group A of the 2018–19 ICC World Twenty20 Europe Qualifier to the Regional Finals of the tournament.

Denmark played their first T20I match against Jersey on 16 June 2019.

Since April 2019, Denmark has played in the 2019–2022 ICC Cricket World Cup Challenge League.

Grounds

Tournament history

ICC World Cup Qualifier
 1979: Semi-finals
 1982: Did not participate
 1986: 3rd place
 1990: Second round
 1994: 10th place
 1997: 5th place
 2001: 8th place
 2005: 8th place
 2009: 12th place
 2014: did not qualify
 2018: did not qualify

ICC World T20 Qualifier
2008–2010: did not qualify
2012: 16th place
2013: 16th place
2015: did not qualify

World Cricket League
 2007: 4th place (Division Two)
 2011: 5th place (Division Three) – relegated
 2012: 4th place (Division Four)
 2014: 3rd place (Division Four)
 2016: 3rd place (Division Four)
 2018: 2nd place (Division Four) – promoted
 2018: 5th place (Division Three)

ICC 6 Nations Challenge
2000: 4th place
2002: Did not participate
2004: Did not participate

European Cricket Championship
1996: 3rd place
1998: Runners up
2000: 6th place (Division One)
2002: 5th place (Division One)
2004: 5th place (Division One)
2006: 4th place (Division One)
2008: 3rd place (Division One)

Players

Current squad
The following list lists the 14 players in Denmark's developmental squad for a tour of Ireland ahead of the 2018–19 ICC T20 World Cup Europe Qualifier Regional Finals tournament.

 Hamid Shah (c)
 Wahab Hashmi
 Taranjit Bharaj 
 Anique Uddin
 Nicolaj Damgaard
 Oliver Damgaard Hald
 Omar Hayatt
 Shangeev Thas
 Jonas Henriksen
 Jino Jojo
 Rizwan Mahmood
 Anders Bulow
 Ihyas Saumy

Other players
See List of Denmark List A cricketers and :Category:Danish cricketers
The following Danish players have played first-class or List A cricket for teams other than Denmark:
 Amjad Khan
 Thomas Hansen
 Soren Henriksen
 Frederik Klokker
 Johan Malcolm
 Ole Mortensen

Records
International Match Summary — Denmark
 
Last updated 4 July 2022

Twenty20 International 
 Highest team total: 256/5 v. Gibraltar on 29 June 2022 at Royal Brussels Cricket Club, Waterloo.
 Highest individual score: 99, Hamid Shah v. Finland on 8 May 2022 at Svanholm Park, Brøndby.  
 Best individual bowling figures: 4/12, Abdullah Mahmood v. Finland on 8 May 2022 at Svanholm Park, Brøndby.

Most T20I runs for Denmark

Most T20I wickets for Denmark

T20I record versus other nations

Records complete to T20I #1611. Last updated 4 July 2022.

See also
 Denmark national women's cricket team
 List of Denmark Twenty20 International cricketers

References

External links
  

Cricket in Denmark
National cricket teams
Cricket
Denmark in international cricket